Dame Gillian Patricia Kempster Beer,  (née Thomas; born 27 January 1935) is a British literary critic and academic. She was President of Clare Hall from 1994 to 2001, and King Edward VII Professor of English Literature at the University of Cambridge from 1994 to 2002.

Early life
Born Gillian Patricia Kempster Thomas  in Surrey, England, Beer studied English Literature at St Anne's College, Oxford.

Academic career
Following teaching posts at Bedford College, London and the University of Liverpool, she was a fellow of Girton College, Cambridge, for 30 years. She was later King Edward VII Professor of English Literature at Cambridge, and later president of Clare Hall, the University of Cambridge's distinctive, international postgraduate college.

She served as chair of the judges for the Booker Prize in 1997.

Her most intensive literary criticism lies in the field of Victorian studies. Darwin's Plots (1983), in particular, related the form of Victorian novels to Darwinist thinking. Its significance as a work was confirmed by the publication of a second edition by Cambridge University Press in 2000 and a third edition in 2009. She has also written important collections of essays on Virginia Woolf (The Common Ground, 1996) and on other aspects of the relations of literature, science, and other academic disciplines.

Honours and awards
She was elected a Fellow of the British Academy in 1991
Dame Commander of the Order of the British Empire (1998)
Foreign Honorary Member of the American Academy of Arts and Sciences (2001)
Oxford University awarded her an Honorary Doctor of Letters (June 2005)
She was elected to the American Philosophical Society in 2010
Harvard University awarded her an Honorary Doctor of Letters (May 2012)
Truman Capote Award for Literary Criticism for Alice in Space: The Sideways Victorian World of Lewis Carroll (October 2017)
Ghent University awarded her an Honorary Doctorate on the recommendation of the Faculty of Arts and Philosophy. (March 2018)

Family
She married the literary critic John Beer in September 1962; they have three sons.

Literary criticism
 Meredith: A Change of Masks (1970)
 Darwin's Plots (1983)
 George Eliot (1986)
 Arguing with the Past (1989)
 Open Fields (1996)
 Virginia Woolf: The Common Ground (1996)
 Alice in Space: The Sideways Victorian World of Lewis Carroll (2016)

Bibliography
A full bibliography of Gillian Beer's work may be found in:
 Literature, Science, Psychoanalysis, 1830-1970: essays in honour of Gillian Beer (Helen Small, Trudi Tate, editors), Oxford University Press, 2003)

References

Sources
 MacLeod, Donald. "Dame Gillian Beer", The Guardian (29 June 2004).

External links
 Biodata on Gillian Beer
 Portrait of Dame Gillian Beer
 Interviewed by Alan Macfarlane 26 January 2009 (video)

 
 

 

1935 births
Living people
Alumni of St Anne's College, Oxford
British literary critics
British women literary critics
Charles Darwin biographers
Dames Commander of the Order of the British Empire
Fellows of the British Academy
Fellows of Clare Hall, Cambridge
Fellows of Girton College, Cambridge
Members of the American Philosophical Society
Fellows of the American Academy of Arts and Sciences
People from Surrey
Fellows of the Royal Society of Literature
Rose Mary Crawshay Prize winners
Presidents of Clare Hall, Cambridge
Academics of Royal Holloway, University of London
20th-century British non-fiction writers
20th-century British women writers
21st-century British non-fiction writers
21st-century British women writers
King Edward VII Professors of English Literature